The Executioner (aka Mack Bolan) is a monthly men's action-adventure paperback series of books.  It has spanned several spin-offs and imitators over its four decades in print and currently has 423 installments (as of February 2014) that have sold more than 200 million copies. Created and initially written by American author Don Pendleton in 1969, who wrote 37 of the original 38 Bolan books (#16 was written by one "Jim Petersen" during a legal dispute between Pendleton and Pinnacle) before he licensed the rights to Gold Eagle in 1980. Since 1981, the series has been written collectively by a series of ghostwriters.

Authors
Authors categorized into the decade in which they published their debut work.

1969-1980

1981-1989

1990-1990

2000-2009

2010-present

References

Executioner